The first USS Pirate (SP-229) was a United States Navy patrol vessel in commission from 1917 to 1918.

Pirate was built as a civilian motorboat of the same name in 1916 by the A. Craven Construction Company at Charleston, South Carolina. The U.S. Navy chartered her from her owner, A. Halsey, on 5 September 1917 for World War I service as a patrol vessel. She was commissioned the same day as USS Pirate (SP-229).

Pirate patrolled along the United States East Coast for the remainder of World War I.

Pirate was returned to her owner on 26 December 1918.

References

Department of the Navy: Navy History and Heritage Command: Online Library of Selected Images: U.S. Navy Ships: USS Pirate (SP-229), 1917-1918. Originally civilian motor boat Pirate (1916)
NavSource Online: Section Patrol Craft Photo Archive: Pirate (SP 229)

Patrol vessels of the United States Navy
World War I patrol vessels of the United States
Ships built in Charleston, South Carolina
1916 ships